The Cavite–Laguna Expressway (CALAX or CALAEX), signed as E3 of the Philippine expressway network, is a partially operational controlled-access toll expressway in the provinces of Cavite and Laguna, Philippines. The construction of the  expressway, which began in July 2019, costs an estimated . Once completed, it will connect the Manila–Cavite Expressway in Kawit to the South Luzon Expressway in Biñan and is expected to ease the traffic congestion in the Cavite–Laguna area, particularly along the Aguinaldo Highway, Governor's Drive, and the Santa Rosa–Tagaytay Road.

Route description 

CALAX begins as the Mamplasan Rotunda, a roundabout intersecting with South Luzon Expressway's Greenfield City-Unilab (Mamplasan) Exit, LIIP Avenue, and Greenfield Parkway in Biñan. It continues west then making a reverse curve to the southwest through the future Greenfield City Biñan development. It enters the Laguna Boulevard right of way near the boulevard's intersection with Greenfield Parkway. It approaches the first toll plaza near the Verdana Homes gated community, and continues southwest, passing through a mix of developed and undeveloped areas at barangays Loma, Timbao and Malamig, then turning south into barangay Biñan, where it passes near Laguna Technopark, De La Salle University – Laguna Campus and several gated communities; access for them is provided by service roads. The expressway partially runs above grade, utilizing underpass bridges, mechanically stabilized earth (MSE) walls and a viaduct at this section to pass above major intersections and accesses.

Entering Santa Rosa, CALAX descends into grade level to cross the Silang–Santa Rosa River and clear a power line, then gently curves to the southwest to follow the Nuvali Boulevard right of way, where the expressway ascends above grade again to pass over South Boulevard, served by the Laguna Boulevard Exit. Past the exit, it leaves the Nuvali Boulevard right of way and crosses the Silang–Santa Rosa River once again, this time the Cavite–Laguna provincial boundary into Silang. It makes another reverse curve through cornfields to the Santa Rosa City Exit, a trumpet interchange which leads to Santa Rosa–Tagaytay Road.

The expressway continues southwest and makes a few turns before traversing a bridge and enters a cut section, passing near the Ayala Westgrove Heights. It turns northwest and passes under Tibig Road before ending at Silang East Exit, a diamond interchange which leads to Tibig-Kaong Road. A future road will be built west of the Silang East interchange that will connect to the Cavite segment of the expressway.

History

Construction and groundbreaking 

There were four pre-qualified bidders vying for CALAX: Alloy MTD Philippines Inc.; Team Orion, the consortium of AC Infrastructure Holdings Inc., AboitizLand, Inc., and Macquarie Infrastructure Holdings Philippines; MPCALA Holdings Inc.; and Optimal Infrastructure Development Inc. of San Miguel Corporation.

Optimal Infrastructure was disqualified on grounds that its bid security fell short of the 180 days required by the government.

After a brief hiatus, the government decided to rebid the project in 2015 to ensure that the government gets the best deal.

Groundbreaking of the project occurred on June 19, 2017, and right-of-way acquisition is continuing as of October 2017. According to a statement by MPCALA Holdings President Luigi Bautista, construction of the Cavite portion of the expressway was expected to begin in April 2018. The groundbreaking ceremony for the Cavite segment was eventually held on March 27, 2019. Meanwhile, the Department of Public Works and Highways, then headed by Secretary Mark Villar, expected the Laguna segment to be opened by October 2019. Currently, the Laguna segment is partially operational and the Cavite segment is still undergoing construction. Both segments were expected to be fully operational and completed by 2022, but was delayed to 2023 due to the COVID-19 pandemic.

Partial opening of Laguna segment and extension to Silang, Cavite 
The first  of the expressway has been made accessible on October 30, 2019, in time for All Saints' Day and All Souls' Day. The entry and exit points at Mamplasan Interchange in Biñan, Laguna and Santa Rosa–Tagaytay Road were opened to serve an estimated 10,000 cars. According to DPWH Secretary Mark Villar, this will cut travel time from 45 minutes to just 10 minutes. However, the segment was supposed to be operational back in December 2018 or by February 2019.

The expressway was closed from January 28 to 31 and February 4 to 7, 2020 at 1:00 AM to 4:00 AM (PST) to give way for construction and clearing operations due to ashfalls brought by the 2020 Taal Volcano eruption.

On August 18, 2020, the Laguna Technopark and Laguna Boulevard Exits in Biñan and Santa Rosa, respectively, were opened to the public.

On August 24, 2021, the  section leading to the Silang East interchange in Silang, Cavite was opened to the public. However, this segment was supposed to be operational back in June 2021. Meanwhile, the section leading to the Silang West (Aguinaldo) interchange is expected to be completed in 2023.

Toll
Cavite–Laguna Expressway is a closed road system, where motorists pay a toll rate based on the vehicle class and distance travelled. Toll collection is done upon exit. The electronic toll collection (ETC) system on the expressway is operated by Easytrip Services Corporation and collections are done on mixed lanes at the toll barriers.

In accordance with law, all toll rates include a 12% value-added tax.

Exits

Notes

References

External links 

Toll roads in the Philippines
Roads in Cavite
Roads in Laguna (province)